Eucalyptus macrocarpa, commonly known as mottlecah, is a species of mallee that is endemic to the south-west of Western Australia. It has smooth bark, usually sessile, heart-shaped adult leaves arranged in opposite pairs, large red flowers and broad conical fruit.

Description
It has smooth, shiny, brownish over salmon-pink bark. Flowering occurs from August to January or April or June and the flowers are red, or rarely, creamy white.

Taxonomy and naming
Eucalyptus macrocarpa was first formally described in 1842 by William Jackson Hooker from a specimen collected by James Drummond from the "guangan". The description was published in Hooker's book,  Icones Plantarum. In Curtis's Botanical Magazine, Hooker noted "[t]he colour of the flowers is due to the stamens alone; for petals (as in the genus) there are none, and the calyx falls off like the lid of a box". He also noted that "the bright red flowers nestled among the leaves, for a very striking object", and that indigenous people called it "morral".

The specific epithet is derived from the ancient Greek words makros (μακρός) meaning "long" and karpos (καρπός) meaning "fruit". Noongar peoples know the tree as mottlecar.

In 1993, Ian Brooker and Stephen Hopper described two subspecies and the names have been accepted by the Australian Plant Census:
 Eucalyptus macrocarpa subsp. elachantha Brooker & Hopper  has smaller leaves, buds and fruit than subspecies macrocarpa;
 Eucalyptus macrocarpa Hook. subsp. macrocarpa. The name elachantha is derived from the ancient Greek words elachys meaning "small" and anthos meaning "flower".

Distribution and habitat
Mottlecah grows in sand in undulating heath between Eneabba, Cataby and Kulin. Subspecies elachantha has a more restricted distribution south-east of Geraldton.

Conservation status
Subspecies macrocarpa is classified as "not threatened", but subspecies elachantha is classified as "Priority Four" by the Government of Western Australia Department of Parks and Wildlife, meaning that is rare or near threatened.

Use in horticulture
Eucalyptus macrocarpa is easily grown from seed, but requires good drainage and a dry, frost-free climate. It was raised from seed in 1842 at Kew Gardens and flowered in 1847.

References

Eucalypts of Western Australia
macrocarpa
Myrtales of Australia
Mallees (habit)
Plants described in 1842
Taxa named by William Jackson Hooker